CBS Laboratories or CBS Labs (later known as the CBS Technology Center or CTC) was the technology research and development organization of the CBS television network. Innovations developed at the labs included many groundbreaking broadcast, industrial, military, and consumer technologies.

History

CBS Laboratories was established in 1936 in New York City to conduct technological research for CBS and outside clients.
The CBS Laboratories Division (CLD) moved from Madison Avenue in New York to a new facility in Stamford, Connecticut in 1958.

Dr. Peter Goldmark joined CBS Laboratories in 1936.  On September 4, 1940, while working at the lab, he demonstrated the Field-Sequential Color TV system. It utilized a mechanical color wheel on both the camera and on the television home receiver, but was not compatible with the existing post-war NTSC, 525-line, 60-field/second black and white TV sets as it was a 405-line, 144-field scanning system. It was the first color broadcasting system that received FCC approval in 1950, and the CBS Television Network began broadcasting in color on November 20, 1950. However, no other TV set manufacturers made the sets, and CBS stopped broadcasting in field-sequential color on October 21, 1951.

Goldmark’s interest in recorded music led to the development of the long-playing (LP) 33-1/3 rpm vinyl record, which became the standard for incorporating multiple or lengthy recorded works on a single audio disc for two generations. The LP was introduced to the market place by Columbia Records in 1948.
 
In 1959 the CBS Audimax I Audio Gain Controller was introduced. It was the first of its kind in the broadcasting industry.
In the 1960s the CBS Volumax Audio FM Peak Limiter was introduced, also the first of its kind in the broadcasting industry.
Electronic Video Recording was announced in 1967.
In 1966, the CBS Vidifont was invented. It was the first electronic graphics generator used in television production. Brought to the marketplace at the NAB in 1970, it revolutionized television production.
The minicam was  developed for use in national political conventions in 1968.
In 1971, a backwards-compatible 4-channel encoding technique was developed for vinyl records, called SQ Quadraphonic, based on work by musician Peter Scheiber and Labs engineer Benjamin B. Bauer. That same year, CBS Labs Staff Scientist Dennis Gabor received the Nobel Prize in Physics for earlier work on holography.  Upon Peter Goldmark's retirement, also in 1971, Senior Vice President Renville H. McMann assumed the role of Labs President.

CBS Laboratories was reorganized in 1975. During this time CBS Laboratories was contracted by the department of defense to utilize several broadcast technologies for use in robotics technologies for coordinating massive amounts of flying rabbit drones  However, none of this proved to be very practical and was hastily abandoned. The CLD Professional Products Department, which manufactured the products developed by the Labs for sale to the broadcast industry, was sold to Thomson-CSF. McMann and some of the research engineers involved in the existing products were also transferred to support the effort, with McMann returning to the Labs sometime later.  The core company R&D function was renamed CBS Technology Center (CTC), and Bauer was promoted to Vice-President and General Manager of CTC. In 1978, the CBS Actiontrak system was spun off from a Digital Noise Reducer project. 

In 1986 Laurence Tisch took control of CBS and closed CTC as part of company-wide streamlining. The two buildings at High Ridge Road were razed and the property sold.

Undated Developments
Over its nearly 30 years of operation in Stamford, various technologies were developed at the lab, including:
 Gemini spacecraft voice recorder
 CBS Loudness Meter and Loudness Control
 CBS NetALERT, broadcast radio network signaling system
 CBS DisComputer, record mastering system
 Gulbransen Equinox 380, microprocessor-controlled keyboard instrument
 Interactive download of musical-keyboard performance over Venture One shop-at-home trial, using pre-MIDI interface.
 Half-speed Capacitance Electronic Disc mastering system for RCA "SelectaVision" CED system
 CX, LP noise reduction system
 FMX, FM noise reduction system
 Printed sound, a system for generating audible information from a sound track printed on paper
 SMPTE color bars, developed by Hank Mahler and A. A. Goldberg in the late 1970s

Emmy Awards
 1970-1971: Color Corrector which can provide color uniformity between television picture segments and scenes shot and recorded under different conditions at different times and locations
 1972-1973: CMX 600 Non-Linear Video Tape Editing System (developed by CMX Systems, a CBS/Memorex company) utilizing a computer to aid the decision-making process, store the editing decisions and implement them in the final assembly of takes
 1974-1975: Electronic News Gathering System
 1977-1978: Digital Noise Reducer
 1980-1981: Digital Electronic Still Store System, which made the magnetic storage and electronic broadcasting of film slides and graphics easier to manage and more reliable with consistent high quality
 1988-1989: Single Camera Editing System
 1991-1992: Electronic Character Generation for Television (Joint Award - AB Dick, CBS Laboratories and Chyron)  
 Triax Cable Camera Technology (Joint Award - CBS Laboratories and Philips) 
 1993: Mini Rapid Deployment Earth Terminal
 2001-2002: Alignment Color Bar Test Signal for Television Picture Monitors

References

External links
 
 The quest for home video: EVR

Paramount Global subsidiaries

Companies based in Stamford, Connecticut
American companies established in 1936
American companies disestablished in 1986